Aleksandr Savin may refer to:
 Aleksandr Savin (volleyball player) (born 1957), Soviet volleyball player
 Alexander Savin (politician) (born 1962), Russian politician
 Aleksandr Savin (football player) (born 1984), Russian footballer
 Aleksandr Savin (rower) (born 1978), Russian Olympic rower
 Alexander Savin (imposter), who claimed to be Tsarevich Alexei of Russia and was arrested by the OGPU in 1928; see Romanov impostors#Alexei impostors